Clitopilus is a genus of fungi in the family Entolomataceae. The genus has a widespread distribution, especially in northern temperate areas. Although a 2008 estimate suggested about 30 species in the genus, a more recent publication (2009) using molecular phylogenetics has redefined the genus to include many former Rhodocybe species.

Species
Clitopilus acerbus Noordel. & Co-David
Clitopilus albovelutinus (G. Stev.) Noordel. & Co-David
Clitopilus alutaceus (Singer) Noordel. & Co-David
Clitopilus amarellus (Cons., D. Antonini, M. Antonini & Contu) Noordel. & Co-David
Clitopilus amygdaliformis Zhu L. Yang
Clitopilus angustisporus (Singer) Noordel. & Co-David
Clitopilus ardosiacus (E. Horak & Griesser) Noordel. & Co-David
Clitopilus aureicystidiatus (Lennox ex T.J. Baroni) Noordel. & Co-David
Clitopilus australis (Singer) Noordel. & Co-David
Clitopilus azalearum (Murrill) Noordel. & Co-David
Clitopilus balearicus (Courtec. & Siquier) Noordel. & Co-David
Clitopilus brunneus (Contu) Noordel. & Co-David
Clitopilus brunnescens (T.J. Baroni & E. Horak) Noordel. & Co-David
Clitopilus byssisedoides Gminder, Noordel. & Co-David
Clitopilus caelatoideus (Dennis) Noordel. & Co-David
Clitopilus carlottae (Redhead & T.J. Baroni) Noordel. & Co-David
Clitopilus cedretorum (Bidaud & Cavet) Noordel. & Co-David
Clitopilus claudopus (Singer ex T.J. Baroni) Noordel. & Co-David
Clitopilus collybioides (Singer) Noordel. & Co-David
Clitopilus conchatus (E. Horak) Noordel. & Co-David
Clitopilus conicus (Singer) Noordel. & Co-David
Clitopilus crepidotoides (Singer) Noordel. & Co-David
Clitopilus cretatus (Berk. & Br.)
Clitopilus crystallinus (T.J. Baroni) Noordel. & Co-David
Clitopilus cupressicola (Carassai, Papa & Contu) Noordel. & Co-David
Clitopilus cyathiformis (Corner & E. Horak) Noordel. & Co-David
Clitopilus densifolius (T.J. Baroni & Ovrebo) Noordel. & Co-David
Clitopilus dingleyae (E. Horak) Noordel. & Co-David
Clitopilus eccentricus (T.J. Baroni & Ovrebo) Noordel. & Co-David
Clitopilus fibulata (Pegler) Noordel. & Co-David
Clitopilus finnmarchiae (Noordel.) Noordel. & Co-David
Clitopilus fuligineus (E. Horak) Noordel. & Co-David
Clitopilus fuscofarinaceus (Kosonen & Noordel.) Noordel. & Co-David
Clitopilus galerinoides (Singer) Noordel. & Co-David
Clitopilus geminus (Fr.) Noordel. & Co-David
Clitopilus gibbosus (E. Horak) Noordel. & Co-David
Clitopilus griseolus (T.J. Baroni & Halling) Noordel. & Co-David
Clitopilus griseosporus (A. Pearson) Noordel. & Co-David
Clitopilus hawaiiensis (Singer) Noordel. & Co-David
Clitopilus heterosporus (Murrill) Noordel. & Co-David
Clitopilus himantiigenus (Speg.) Noordel. & Co-David
Clitopilus hispanicus (Esteve-Rav. & G. Moreno) Noordel. & Co-David
Clitopilus hondensis (Murrill) Noordel. & Co-David
Clitopilus horakii (Pacioni & Lalli) Noordel. & Co-David
Clitopilus hygrophoroides (T.J. Baroni & Halling) Noordel. & Co-David
Clitopilus ilicicola (Lonati) Noordel. & Co-David
Clitopilus incarnatus (T.J. Baroni & Halling) Noordel. & Co-David
Clitopilus iti (E. Horak) Noordel. & Co-David
Clitopilus lactariiformis (Singer) Noordel. & Co-David
Clitopilus laetus (Singer) Noordel. & Co-David
Clitopilus lateralipes (E. Horak) Noordel. & Co-David
Clitopilus lateritius (T.J. Baroni & G.M. Gates) Noordel. & Co-David
Clitopilus luteocinnamomeus (T.J. Baroni & Ovrebo) Noordel. & Co-David
Clitopilus lutetianus (E.-J. Gilbert ) Noordel. & Co-David
Clitopilus mairei (T.J. Baroni) Noordel. & Co-David
Clitopilus maleolens (E. Horak) Noordel. & Co-David
Clitopilus marasmioides (Singer) Noordel. & Co-David
Clitopilus melleus (T.J. Baroni & Ovrebo) Noordel. & Co-David
Clitopilus melleopallens (P.D. Orton) Noordel. & Co-David
Clitopilus mordax (G.F. Atk.) Noordel. & Co-David
Clitopilus multilamellatus (E. Horak) Noordel. & Co-David
Clitopilus muritai (G. Stev.) Noordel. & Co-David
Clitopilus mustellinus (E. Horak) Noordel. & Co-David
Clitopilus mycenoides (Singer) Noordel. & Co-David
Clitopilus naucoria (Singer) Noordel. & Co-David
Clitopilus nitellinus (Fr.) Noordel. & Co-David
Clitopilus nitellinoides (E. Horak) Noordel. & Co-David
Clitopilus nuciolens (Murrill) Noordel. & Co-David
Clitopilus obscurus (Pilát) Noordel. & Co-David
Clitopilus obtusatulus (E. Horak) Noordel. & Co-David
Clitopilus ochraceopallidus (Ballero & Contu) Noordel. & Co-David
Clitopilus pallens (E. Horak) Noordel. & Co-David
Clitopilus pallidogriseus (T.J. Baroni & G.M. Gates) Noordel. & Co-David
Clitopilus parilis var. wagramensis (Hauskn. & Noordel.) Noordel. & Co-David
Clitopilus passeckerianus (Pilát) Singer
Clitopilus paurii (T.J. Baroni, Moncalvo, R.P. Bhatt & S.L. Stephenson) Noordel. & Co-David
Clitopilus peculiaris (Contu & Bon) Noordel. & Co-David
Clitopilus pegleri (T.J. Baroni) Noordel. & Co-David
Clitopilus perplexus (T.J. Baroni & Watling) Noordel. & Co-David
Clitopilus perstriatus (Corner & E. Horak) Noordel. & Co-David
Clitopilus piperatus (G. Stev.) Noordel. & Co-David
Clitopilus pleurogenus (Pegler) Noordel. & Co-David
Clitopilus porcelanicus (Dennis) Noordel. & Co-David
Clitopilus praesidentialis (Cons., Contu, M. Roy, Selosse & Vizzini) Noordel. & Co-David
Clitopilus priscuus (T.J. Baroni) Noordel. & Co-David
 Clitopilus prunulus (Scop.) P. Kumm.
Clitopilus pseudonitellinus (Dennis) Noordel. & Co-David
Clitopilus pseudopiperitus (T.J. Baroni & G.M. Gates) Noordel. & Co-David
Clitopilus pulchrispermus (T.J. Baroni & Halling) Noordel. & Co-David
Clitopilus radicatus (Cleland) Noordel. & Co-David
Clitopilus reticulatus (Cleland) Noordel. & Co-David
Clitopilus rhizogenus (T.J. Baroni & E. Horak) Noordel. & Co-David
Clitopilus russularia (Singer) Noordel. & Co-David
Clitopilus semiarboricola (T.J. Baroni) Noordel. & Co-David
Clitopilus stanglianus (Bresinsky & Pfaff) Noordel. & Co-David
Clitopilus stipitatus (A.H. Sm. & Hesler) Noordel. & Co-David
Clitopilus subcaespitosus (Esteve-Rav.) Noordel. & Co-David
Clitopilus tasmanicus (T.J. Baroni & G.M. Gates) Noordel. & Co-David
Clitopilus tergipes (Corner & E. Horak) Noordel. & Co-David
Clitopilus testaceus (Dennis) Noordel. & Co-David
Clitopilus tillii (Krisai & Noordel.) Noordel. & Co-David
Clitopilus umbrosus (T.J. Baroni & Halling) Noordel. & Co-David
Clitopilus variisporus (Voto) Noordel. & Co-David
Clitopilus vernalis Har. Takah. & Degawa 2011 – Japan
Clitopilus verrucosus (Thiers) Noordel. & Co-David
Clitopilus villosus (E. Horak) Noordel. & Co-David

References

Entolomataceae
Agaricales genera
Taxa named by Elias Magnus Fries